Crevoladossola is a comune (municipality) in the Province of Verbano-Cusio-Ossola in the Italian region Piedmont, located about  northeast of Turin and about  northwest of Verbania.

Crevoladossola borders the following municipalities: Bognanco, Crodo, Domodossola, Masera, Montecrestese, Trasquera, Varzo. In 1487, it was the location of the battle of Crevola between the Swiss Confederation and the Duchy of Milan.

References

Cities and towns in Piedmont